Kobelt Airport  is a privately owned, public use airport in Ulster County, New York, United States. It is located three nautical miles (6 km) northeast of the central business district of Wallkill and is also known as Kobelt/Wallkill Airport. This airport is included in the National Plan of Integrated Airport Systems for 2011–2015, which categorized it as a general aviation reliever airport.

Although most U.S. airports use the same three-letter location identifier for the FAA and IATA, this airport is assigned N45 by the FAA but has no designation from the IATA.

Facilities and aircraft 
Kobelt Airport covers an area of 125 acres (51 ha) at an elevation of 420 feet (128 m) above mean sea level. It has one runway designated 3/21 with an asphalt surface measuring 2,864 by 50 feet (873 x 15 m).

For the 12-month period ending July 20, 2011, the airport had 15,000 general aviation aircraft operations, an average of 41 per day. At that time there were 27 aircraft based at this airport: 96% single-engine and 4% multi-engine.

NU CAVU restaurant is located on the Kobelt airport. During the summer on Friday evenings, skydiving contests are held in front of the restaurant.

References

External links 
  Airport Website
 

Airports in New York (state)
Transportation_buildings_and_structures_in_Ulster_County,_New_York